Tiantong Road is an interchange station between Line 10 and Line 12 of the Shanghai Metro. It entered operation on 10 April 2010. Line 12 opened on 29 December 2013, and served as the western terminus of the initial section of the line until 10 May 2014, when it was extended one stop westward to Qufu Road.

Station Layout

References 
 

Railway stations in Shanghai
Shanghai Metro stations in Hongkou District
Shanghai Metro stations in Jing'an District
Railway stations in China opened in 2010
Line 10, Shanghai Metro
Line 12, Shanghai Metro